Napaskiak is a city in Bethel Census Area, Alaska, United States. At the 2010 census the population was 405, up from 390 in 2000.

Geography

Demographics

Napaskiak first appeared on the 1880 U.S. Census as the unincorporated Inuit village of "Napaskiagamute." All 196 residents were Inuit. In 1890, it returned as "Napaskeagamiut." All residents that year also were native. It did not appear on the census again until 1940, under the present spelling of Napaskiak. In 1950 and 1960, it was returned under the spelling of "Napaiskak." The spelling was reverted to the prior Napaskiak in 1970. It was formally incorporated the following year (1971).

As of the census of 2000, there were 390 people, 82 households, and 70 families residing in the city. The racial makeup of the city was 1.54% White, 97.44% Native American, 0.26% Asian, and 0.77% from two or more races.  0.26% of the population were Hispanic or Latino of any race.

There were 82 households, out of which 56.1% had children under the age of 18 living with them, 59.8% were married couples living together, 18.3% had a female householder with no husband present, and 14.6% were non-families. 13.4% of all households were made up of individuals, and 8.5% had someone living alone who was 65 years of age or older.  The average household size was 4.76 and the average family size was 5.24.

In the city, the age distribution of the population shows 43.6% under the age of 18, 10.3% from 18 to 24, 27.7% from 25 to 44, 11.8% from 45 to 64, and 6.7% who were 65 years of age or older.  The median age was 22 years. For every 100 females, there were 104.2 males.  For every 100 females age 18 and over, there were 96.4 males.

The median income for a household in the city was $31,806, and the median income for a family was $32,083. Males had a median income of $25,469 versus $25,000 for females. The per capita income for the city was $8,162.  About 16.9% of families and 20.2% of the population were below the poverty line, including 20.1% of those under age 18 and 20.0% of those age 65 or over.

Education
Lower Kuskokwim School District operates the Zacharias John Williams Memorial School, PreK-12.  it has 155 students, with 90% classified as learners of English as a second language, 85% are on free or reduced lunch programs, and the majority are of Central Yupik Eskimo origins; that year only two students were not Yupik. That year the school had 34 employees, with four of them being native Alaskans; the employees included 16 teachers. The current building opened in October 2016, and the original building opened in 1982.

References

External links

Cities in Alaska
Cities in Bethel Census Area, Alaska